Ali Goudarzi (born March 8, 1992) is an Iranian footballer.

Club career
Goudarzi had been with Zob Ahan from 2010 to 2013.

References

External sources
 Profile at PersianLeague
 

1992 births
Living people
Zob Ahan Esfahan F.C. players
Iranian footballers
Association football defenders
People from Bandar-e Anzali
Sportspeople from Gilan province